South Salmara Mankachar is an administrative district in the state of Assam in India. The district headquarter is located at Hatsingimari village which is situated at about 245 km from Guwahati. It was earlier a sub-division of the Dhubri District.

History

South Salmara Mankachar was created by bifurcating Old Dhubri district in 2016. On 15 August 2015 Assam's Chief Minister Tarun Gogoi announced 5 new administrative district in Assam; South Salmara Mankachar was one among those. On 9 February 2016 Commissioner, Lower Assam and Central Assam Division Md. Mahtab Uddin Ahmed, IAS inaugurated South Salmara Mankachar as an administrative district at a function in Hatsingimari with the presence of thousands of people. There are few historical sites in the district. However, the famous ones are the tomb of Mir Jumla and Kamakhya Temple at Mankachar.

Geography

It occupies 980/km 2 (2,500/sq mi) of density and is an administrative district in the state of Assam in India. The district headquarters are located at
Hatsingimari town which is situated at about 245 km from Guwahati, the state capital. Earlier it was a sub-division of Dhubri District. It shares its borders with Bangladesh in the west and Meghalaya in the south-east.The general topography of South Salmara Mankachar district is plain with patches of small hillocks like Bansali, Rangatari, etc. All these are situated in the southwestern part of the district. Mighty river Brahmaputra is flowing through this district from east to west with its tributaries, and the majority of the population live on chars in the river. Other rivers are Jinjiram, Kalonadi (also known as Ganol) etc.

Economy

South Salmara Mankachar District is primarily dependent on agricultural and forest products. The main source of income is paddy (both winter and autumn) with surplus production. Jute and mustard seed occupy the major share of cash crops. Wheat, maize, pulses and sugarcane are also grown moderately. From forest, mainly timber and bamboo add to the income, though boulders and sand are also available. Fish, milk, meat, and eggs have small contributions to the economy. Currently, three tea gardens, whose contribution to the district economy is almost negligible, cover an area of 1362.33 hectares. Land revenue collection is minimal, whereas tax from check gates and excise duty occupy much of the government exchequer. Devoid of major industrial production, the district uses more funds for administration, development, and welfare works than it provides.

Its rich natural wealth is yet to be explored and some believe that proper utilisation of natural resources could provide a boost for the struggling economy.

Divisions
The district's only sub-division is Hatsingimari (also called Sadar") and there are two revenue circles: Mankachar and South Salmara. Mankachar is a census town and the district has three police stations.

There are two Assam Legislative Assembly constituencies in this district; 21 Mankachar and 22 South Salmara. Both are part of the Dhubri Lok Sabha constituency.

Demographics
According to the 2011 census, the district has a population of 555,114. Scheduled Castes make up 7,767 which is 1.40% of the population and Scheduled Tribes make up 4,032 which is 0.73% of the population.

About 95.19% of the population are Muslims, 4.49% are Hindu and rest 0.3% are Christians and Sikhs.

Languages

According to the 2011 census, in the district 328,242 speak Assamese and 220,761 speak Bengali. Minority languages are spoken by 1.16% of the population.

Education

There are several renowned schools and colleges in the district. Some of them are:
 
Hatsingimari Junior College, Hatsingimari
Hatsingimari College,Hatsingimari
Kukurmara Higher Secondary School, Charbari
Mankachar College
Little Star English Academy, Mankachar
South Salmara College
Rani Bhabani Priya Higher Secondary School, South Salmara
There are many private coaching and tuition classes. Students from Meghalaya and other parts of the district comes here for their schooling.

Culture

The culture of the people in this district is a mixed culture. About 95% of the population are Muslims 4% Hindus and 1%  Christians. Most of the people speak Goalpariya(Deshee) dialect. This dialect is nowadays regarded as a sub-language of Assamaese Language. But it is a different language having its own vocabulary and grammar. And some people speak the dialect of Mymensingh,Pabna, Barishal of Bangladesh. The people who speak the Deshi (Goalpariya dialect) are called Ujanee or Deshee people and those who speak the dialects of Mymensingh, Pabna and Barishal of Bangladesh are called Bhatiya . Nowadays the term Bhatiya has been substituted by  "Miya ". Though religiously the Dehsis ( Ujanee) and Bhatiyas belong to the same group, there are a lot of differences between these two groups. Deshis are the indigenous people who were converted  time to time from the local indigenous groups like Koch, Rajbongshi, Mech, Jogi, Rabha, Napit, Fisherman, Kalitas etc. The Deshis claim that they are the offsprings of Ali Mech. Ghoti and Tribal people, who are very few in number have also contributed to the culture of the district. The men of the district wear pants, paijamas and kurtas as their traditional garments, while the women wear sarees.

Transport

Airway

It was constructed during World War II by the British Govt. mainly for military purpose. Till 1983, the Indian Airlines and some private commercial flights operated regularly between Calcutta, Guwahati and Dhubri. Now it is totally closed. However, recently the ministry of DONER, GOI, has taken some initiative to renovate and functionalise the airport.

Waterway

The town had a very busy river port on the bank of the Brahmaputra, which was used as an international trade centre with the neighbouring countries, especially in the British era. At present, the port is lying idle. However, small ferries transport people to and from Dhubri every day.

Railway

There is no Railway station in the district.

Road

There is no National Highway in the district. Transportation takes place through state maintained pwd roads, which are full of potholes. Hatsingimari is in the centre place in the District while one part of Hatsingimari town is attached with Assam-Meghalaya border. There is no PWD road between South Salmara and Mankachar. only overland communication from South Salmara to Mankachar is Fulbari–Singimari road through Meghalaya.

Town

Mankachar is the only town in the District other than the district capital.

Villages
 Charbari 
 Fekamari
 Hatsingimari
 Kokradanga 
 Pipulbari Pt III
 Hazirhat
  Patakata
 Kakripara

References 

Districts of Assam

Minority Concentrated Districts in India
2016 establishments in Assam